When We Get There is a novel about coming-of-age by the American writer Shauna Seliy set in 1974 in a coal mining patch (modeled on the author’s hometown of Yukon, Westmoreland County) near Pittsburgh, Pennsylvania.

The novel tells the story of Lucas Lessar. His father has died in a mining accident and his mother has mysteriously disappeared, so he lives with his grandmother. Zoli, his mother's estranged boyfriend, starts to harass Lucas, prompting him to skip school and take long bus rides in attempts to find his mother.

References

2007 American novels
American bildungsromans
Novels set in Pennsylvania
Fiction set in 1974
Westmoreland County, Pennsylvania
Bloomsbury Publishing books